Hope Ralph (born 14 April 2000) is a field hockey player from New Zealand, who plays as a forward. She attended Sacred Heart Girls' College in New Plymouth.

Career

Domestic league
In the Ford National Hockey League, Ralph plays for Central.

National teams

Under-21
Hope Ralph made her debut for the New Zealand U-21 team in 2018 during a Trans–Tasman test series against Australia in Hastings. She followed this up with an appearance at a Tri–Nations tournament in Canberra in December 2019.

Black Sticks
Ralph made her senior debut for the Black Sticks in 2020, during the second season of the FIH Pro League. She was also selected for the Black Sticks side who travelled to the 2020 Summer Olympics in Tokyo. She scored a goal in her Olympic debut as the team won against Argentina.

Awards

Ralph was selected to be part of the Future Champions programme administered by Sport Taranaki in 2017. Ralph was a recipient of a Prime Minister's Athlete Scholarship in 2021 and was also named the AUT Sportswoman of the Year in 2021 which recognised her "high academic ability, outstanding athletic performance, and community contribution."

International goals

References

External links
 
 
 
 
 

2000 births
Living people
Female field hockey forwards
Olympic field hockey players of New Zealand
Field hockey players at the 2020 Summer Olympics
Field hockey players at the 2022 Commonwealth Games
21st-century New Zealand women